The Statue of Saladin is an oversize equestrian bronze statue depicting the Ayyubid Sultan Saladin located in front of the 11th century Citadel of Damascus, in the Ancient City of Damascus in Damascus, Syria. The statue was designed by Syrian sculptor Abdallah al-Sayed. It was unveiled by the then Syrian president Hafez Assad in 1993, marking the 800th anniversary of Saladin's death.

The bronze statue represents Saladin's victory at the Battle of Hittin, with him seated proudly and triumphantly on his horse accompanied by two swordsmen with Renaud de Chatillon and Guy de Lusignan whom he captured at the battle walking behind him on foot while the crown of the Kingdom of Jerusalem lies on the floor.

Other statues of Saladin

Old Jerusalem
 Saladin and Richard the Lionheart equestrian statue, Old Jerusalem

Karak
 Saladin equestrian statue, Karak, Jordan

References

Monuments and memorials in Damascus
1992 sculptures
Bronze sculptures in Syria
Equestrian statues in Syria
Syrian art
Cultural depictions of Saladin
Saladin